Kim Kyung-ho (born June 7, 1971) is a South Korean singer who is often referred to as a "legend of rock" for his efforts in bringing rock music to South Korea and his four octave vocal range. He makes frequent appearances on South Korean variety shows.

Biography
Kim was born in Mokpo, South Korea. He is known as the National Rock Star with charismatic presence on stage and later on called as Rock Unnie or National Sister because of his long hair and feminine look.

He made his first appearance on Korea's music scene in 1989 on an annual competition for talented youths hosted by KBS.
In 1991, he also joined on MBC's University Music Festival where he got bronze award for his self-composed song Long Goodbye which was also included on his first album.

His debut album released in 1995 entitled Kim Kyung Ho, and while not commercially successful earned him some recognition among Korean rock music fans.  His more novel second album, Kim:kyungho 1997 was much better received and the song "People Who Make Me Sorrow" topped on music charts which made him popular. Since then, he rose to mainstream success and released numerous hit songs such as "Forbidden Love", "Heartless", "Until the day we love beautifully", "My Love, Even In The Heavens", "Though I Love You", "Wine", and "Father".

He also collaborated to the soundtrack of the 2002 Korean drama series Empress Myeongseong and 2004 (of which he covered Within Temptation song; "Mother Earth").

After Several years of popularity things took a downturn for him in 2003 when he was diagnosed with cord nodules. In 2007 Kim was diagnosed with Avascular necrosis.

Kim Kyung-ho renewed his popularity through his participation in variety shows, and numerous appearances in televised singing competitions as part of an entourage of industry-veteran vocalists. In September 2011 he joined the hit Show I Am a Singer and with his long hair and dance moves, he gained the title as "Rock Unnie". He was the fifth artist to graduate from the show, doing so in the final round. His popularity continued as he appeared on other variety shows such as Hidden Singer, Happy Together, and Running Man, In 2014, he joined the television music competition Immortal Songs 2: Singing the Legend, where he won the trophy several times.In May 15 and 22, 2016, he appeared on episodes 59–60 of the singing competition King of Mask Singer.

Kim Kyung-ho married on November 8, 2014, with a Japanese woman working in finances. In August 2018, Kim announced that the couple had been divorced since June 2018.

Discography

Studio albums

Mini albums

Single albums

Live albums

Awards

Golden Disk Awards

Mnet Asian Music Awards

Seoul Music Awards

Activities and Shows

Variety Shows

Pre-Tour Concerts 2018

Events 2018

TV Broadcast 2018

References

External links

 Official website

1971 births
Living people
People from Mokpo
South Korean rock singers
21st-century South Korean male singers
20th-century South Korean male singers